San Rafael Cedros is a municipality in the Cuscatlán department of El Salvador. It is located near the capital.

External links
 https://web.archive.org/web/20061212095827/http://www.sanrafaelcedros.com/

Municipalities of the Cuscatlán Department